The Old Synagogue was an Orthodox Jewish synagogue situated in the Kazimierz district of Kraków, Poland. In Yiddish it was referred to as the Alta Shul. It is the oldest synagogue building still standing in Poland, and one of the most precious landmarks of Jewish architecture in Europe. Until the beginning of the Second World War in 1939, it was one of the city's most important synagogues as well as the main religious, social, and organizational centre of the Kraków Jewish community.

The Synagogue was built in 1407 or 1492; the date of building varies with several sources. The original building was rebuilt in 1570, by the Italian architect Mateo Gucci. The rebuilding included the attic wall with loopholes, windows placed far above ground level, and thick, masonry walls with heavy buttressing to withstand siege, all features borrowed from military architecture. There was further reconstruction work in 1904 and in 1913. The Old Synagogue is a rare, surviving example of a Polish fortress synagogue. In 1794 General Tadeusz Kościuszko spoke from the synagogue to gain the Jewish support in the Kościuszko Uprising. A plaque in the entrance hall commemorates this event:
"The Jews proved to the world that whenever humanity can gain, they would not spare themselves." – General Tadeusz Kościuszko

The synagogue was completely devastated and ransacked by the Germans during World War II. Its artwork and Jewish relics, looted. During the occupation, the synagogue was used as a warehouse. In 1943, 30 Polish hostages were executed at its wall. The Old Synagogue was renovated from 1956 to 1959 and currently operates as a museum. It is a division of the Historical Museum of Kraków, with particular focus on Kraków's Jews. The exhibits are divided into themes dealing with birth, prayer rituals, diet, divorce and death. The women's prayer room (Ezrat Nashim), dating back to the 17th century, is often used to hold temporary exhibitions.

See also 
 Zamość Synagogue
 Synagogues of Krakow
 Remuh Synagogue
 Tempel Synagogue
 Izaak Synagogue
 Wolf Popper Synagogue
 High Synagogue (Kraków)
 Kupa Synagogue

References

External links 

 How to get there?
 JewishKrakow.net A guide to Kazimierz, Kraków's Jewish Quarter.
 Old Synagogue
 Holocaust Interview

Ashkenazi Jewish culture in Poland
Former synagogues in Poland
Orthodox synagogues in Poland
Religious buildings and structures completed in 1492
Synagogues in Kraków
Museums in Kraków
Romanesque and Gothic synagogues
15th-century synagogues
Fortress synagogues
Gothic architecture in Poland
Holocaust locations in Poland